Silvia Valeria Hugec (born December 22, 2000) is a Slovak-American retired figure skater. She is the 2018 Slovak national champion and represented Slovakia at the 2018 European Championships, where she qualified to the final segment.

Personal life 
Silvia Valeria Hugec was born on December 22, 2000, in Paterson, New Jersey. Her parents moved to the United States from Slovakia in 1998. She resides in the suburbs of Minneapolis and studied at Mounds Park Academy in Saint Paul, Minnesota.  After taking a gap year, she now attends Columbia University School of General Studies and is a new member of the Epsilon Upsilon chapter of Kappa Alpha Theta sorority.

Career

Early years 
Hugec started to skate as a five-year-old under the supervision of Ukrainian coach Igor Korobko and then transitioned to Canadian coach Lorie Charbonneau. She has multiple medals from Minnesota State Figure Skating Championships.

2016–2017
Hugec started competing internationally for Slovakia in October 2016, at the ISU Junior Grand Prix in Germany. In November 2016, she began training with Ann Eidson and Benjamin Miller Reisman at the Saint Paul Figure Skating Club.

In February 2017, she won the silver medal at the Slovak Junior Championships and placed 8th at the 2017 European Youth Olympic Winter Festival.

2017–2018
Hugec placed 12th at the ISU Junior Grand Prix in Austria. She finished 9th at a senior event, the 2017 CS Ondrej Nepela Trophy, which was part of the 2017–18 ISU Challenger Series. In December 2017, a few days before her 17th birthday, she became the Slovak national champion in the absence of Nicole Rajicova.

Hugec qualified to the final segment at the 2018 European Championships in Moscow.

Programs

Results 
GP: Grand Prix; CS: Challenger Series; JGP: Junior Grand Prix

References

External links 
 

2000 births
Living people
People from Paterson, New Jersey
Slovak female single skaters
Columbia University School of General Studies alumni